Shuanglin Station (Simplified Chinese: 双林站 Traditional Chinese: 雙林站 Pinyin: Shuānglín Zhàn) is an underground rapid transit station located in Jinnan District, Tianjin, China, near the Tianjin University of Technology and Education. It was the southern terminus station on Line 1 of the Tianjin Metro between 2006 and 2016.

The old at-grade station was closed on 28 December 2016 to make way for the southern extension of Line 1. A new underground station replaced it when the extension opened on December 3, 2018.

Station Exits
Shuanglin station has two exits (nearby facilities and attractions are listed below):
Exit A - Haitian Xin Yuan (海天馨苑) and Tianjin Metro Operating Company (天津地铁运营公司).
Exit B - Tianjin University of Technology and Education

Transport links

Buses
No. 629, 652, 665, 676, 808, 855 etc.

External links

Railway stations in Tianjin
Tianjin Metro stations
Railway stations in China opened in 2006